Macrochenus is a genus of longhorn beetles of the subfamily Lamiinae, containing the following species:

 Macrochenus assamensis Breuning, 1935
 Macrochenus atkinsoni Gahan, 1893
 Macrochenus guerini (White, 1858)
 Macrochenus isabellinus Aurivillius, 1920
 Macrochenus lacordairei (Thomson, 1865)
 Macrochenus melanospilus Gahan, 1906
 Macrochenus tigrinus (Olivier, 1792)
 Macrochenus tonkinensis Aurivillius, 1920
 Macrochenus semijunctus Pic, 1944

References

Lamiini